Death Wish II: The Original Soundtrack - Music by Jimmy Page  is a soundtrack album by Jimmy Page, released by Swan Song Records on 15 February 1982, to accompany the film Death Wish II.

Overview
Following the XYZ project, Page was asked by his London neighbour, movie director Michael Winner, to record a soundtrack for the film Death Wish II in late August 1981. Page was given a deadline of a few weeks to write and record the album at his personal studio The Sol and to travel on location to Los Angeles with Winner for songwriting themes. Winner later explained:

Death Wish II starred Charles Bronson, and was set around Los Angeles, which inspired Page to write a blues-flavoured soundtrack. The soundtrack features Dave Mattacks from Fairport Convention, former Pretty Things keyboards player Gordon Edwards, and veteran singer Chris Farlowe, who also later appeared on Page's 1988 solo album Outrider. Page used a Roland guitar synthesizer on a number of the tracks. Tracks from this album were later reused by Winner for Death Wish III. Page was later asked by Winner to compose the soundtrack for Scream for Help (1985), but he declined and suggested John Paul Jones to the director instead.

This album is Page's only solo material to appear on Led Zeppelin's record label Swan Song Records. His two later albums with The Firm were released on Atlantic and Outrider was on Geffen Records. Swan Song ceased operations in 1983.

In Japan a vinyl LP was released that featured rare outtakes from the Sol sessions. Death Wish II was released in CD format in 1999, but all CD versions of the album are now out of print. Today used copies are highly collectible, and can sell for over a hundred dollars.

Even though the track "Prelude" is credited solely to Page himself, it is based on "Prelude No. 4 in E minor (Op. 28)" by Frédéric Chopin.

The album was re-released by Jimmy Page exclusively through JimmyPage.com on 1 December 2011, in a "heavyweight vinyl package includes previously unreleased material, all-new 2011 sleeve notes and updated artwork." Only 1000 copies were released. Numbers 1–109 have been signed by Jimmy Page, while numbers 110–1000 are available unsigned.

Track listing 

1999 Compact disc edition
Same track listing and order as the vinyl release.

Personnel
Jimmy Page – vocals, acoustic guitars, electric guitars, guitar synthesizer, synthesizer, theremin, bass, producer
Gordon John Edwards   – vocals, electric piano, piano
Stuart Epps – engineer, mixing
Chris Farlowe – Vocals
Dave Lawson – piano, synthesizers
Dave Mattacks  – drums, percussion
David Paton – bass
David Sinclair Whittaker – piano
GLC Philharmonic  – orchestra
The Sol Symphonic – strings

Charts

References

External links
 

Action film soundtracks
Albums produced by Jimmy Page
1982 soundtrack albums
Swan Song Records soundtracks
Jimmy Page albums
Death Wish (franchise)